The George Ryder Stakes is an Australian Turf Club Group 1 Thoroughbred horse race for three-year-olds and over at Weight for age conditions, over a distance of 1500 metres at Rosehill Gardens Racecourse, Sydney, Australia in March or April. It is run on the same day as the Golden Slipper Stakes.
The prize money is A$1,000,000.

Winx is the only horse to have won the race more than two times.

History

The origins of the race are from 1903 when the race was run as the Railway Stakes on the same race card as the Rawson Stakes. The race was renamed in 1974 in honour of George E. Ryder who was a racing administrator, stud master and businessman.

The winner is exempt from ballot for the prestigious Doncaster Handicap.

Name

 1903–1914 - Railway Stakes 
 1915–1945 - Railway Handicap
 1946–1973 - Railway Quality Handicap 
 1968–1970 - CP Air Quality Hcp
 1971–1973 - Railway Quality Handicap 
 1974–2017 - George Ryder Stakes

Distance
 1903–1914 -  furlongs (~1300 metres)
 1915–1972 - 7 furlongs (~1400 metres)
 1973–1984 - 1400 metres
 1985 - 1450 metres (~7.2 furlongs)
 1986 onwards - 1500 metres (~7.5 furlongs)

Grade
 1903–1979 - Principal race
 1980 onwards - Group 1 race

Winners

 2022 - Forbidden Love
 2021 - Think It Over
 2020 - Dreamforce
 2019 - Winx
 2018 - Winx
 2017 - Winx
 2016 - Winx
 2015 - Real Impact
 2014 - Gordon Lord Byron
 2013 - Pierro
 2012 - Metal Bender
 2011 - Rangirangdoo
 2010 - Danleigh
 2009 - Vision And Power
 2008 - Weekend Hussler
 2007 - Haradasun
 2006 - Racing To Win
 2005 - Court's In Session
 2004 - Lonhro
 2003 - Lonhro
 2002 - Lord Essex
 2001 - Landsighting
 2000 - Al Mansour
 1999 - Referral
 1998 - Quick Flick
 1997 - Mouawad
 1996 - Ravarda
 1995 - March Hare
 1994 - Telesto
 1993 - Schillaci
 1992 - Kinjite
 1991 - Bureaucracy
 1990 - Straussbrook
 1989 - Wong
 1988 - Campaign King
 1987 - Campaign King
 1986 - Heat Of The Moment
 1985 - Hula Drum
 1984 - Emancipation
 1983 - Emancipation
 1982  - Pure Of Heart
 1981  - Prince Ruling
 1980  - Manikato
 1979  - Manikato
 1978  - Command Module
 1977  - Pacific Ruler
 1976  - Superior Air
 1975  - Dalrello
 1974  - Itchy Feet
 1973  - All Shot
1972 - Triton
1971 - Baguette
1970 - Boy Dandy
1969 - Foresight
1968 - Foresight
1967 - Time And Tide
1966 - Rakaia
1965 - Rush Bye
1964 - Time And Tide
1963 - Prince Regoli
1962 - Prince Regoli
1961 - Grecian Vale
1960 - Man Of Iron
1959 - Book Link
1958 - Chieti
1957 - New Spec
1956 - King's Fair
1955 - Gay Vista
1954 - Carioca
1953 - Regoli
1952 - Coniston
1951 - Drastic
1950 - Buzmark
1949 - Comedy Prince
1948 - Heroic Sovereign
1947 - Tamaroa
1946 - Bragger
1945 - Melhero
1944 - Warlock
1943 - Triad
1942 - race not held
1941 - Evergreen
1940 - Cigarette
1939 - Bramol
1938 - Mohican
1937 - Cereza
1936 - Gay Blonde
1935 - †Sarcherie / High
1934 - Leila Vale
1933 - Whittingham
1932 - Myles La Coplen
1931 - Casque D'Or
1930 - †Sir Chrystopher / Greenline
1929 - Cleave
1928 - Vaals
1928 - Ascalon
1927 - †Fujisan / Cavedweller
1926 - Lausanne
1925 - Encre
1925 - Valiant
1924 - Claro
1923 - Naharadan
1923 - Volpi
1922 - †Sir Maitland / Braehead
1921 - Beauford
1920 - Chrysolaus
1919 - Hem
1918 - Dame Acre
1917 - Spurn
1916 - Gold Brew
1915 - Eugeny
1914 - Sunlike
1913 - race not held
1912 - Miocene
1911 - Maltster Maid
1910 - Vauntie
1909 - Microscope
1908 - Lord Merv
1907 - Thalaba
1906 - Zythos
1905 - Lucknow
1904 - Cressy 
1903 - Marvel Loch  

† Race run in Divisions

See also
 List of Australian Group races
 Group races

External links 
First three placegetters George Ryder Stakes (ATC)

References

Group 1 stakes races in Australia
Open mile category horse races